Manzoor Ahmad Chinioti (Urdu; مولانا منظور احمد چنیوٹی) (born; 31 December 1931– 27 June 2004) was a Pakistani Islamic scholar, politician and writer.

Early life and education
Manzoor Ahmad Chinioti got his education from Sindh Madressatul Islam University, and Jamia Taleem ul Quran Rawalpindi. He founded Jamia Arabia Chiniot.

Political career
He served as a councilor in his home town and chairman of the Chiniot Municipal Committee in 1993. He was also elected Member of the Provincial Assembly of the Punjab in 1985, 1988 and 1997.

He also served as the central leader of the International Khatme Nabuwat Movement.

He also served as visiting professor at Jamia-tul-Madina.

Death
He died on 27 June 2004.

References 

1931 births
2004 deaths
People from Chiniot District
Sindh Madressatul Islam University alumni
Punjab MPAs 1985–1988
Punjab MPAs 1988–1990
Punjab MPAs 1997–1999
Pakistani Islamic religious leaders
Pakistani Sunni Muslim scholars of Islam
Muslim missionaries
Pakistani religious writers
Politicians from Punjab, Pakistan